Allan Reuss (June 15, 1915 – June 4, 1988) was an American jazz guitarist.

Biography
Reuss was born New York City, he began playing professionally as a banjoist at age 12. He learned guitar from George Van Eps. In the middle of the 1930s, Reuss began playing in Benny Goodman's orchestra, playing with him on and off until 1943. He played with Paul Whiteman and then with Jack Teagarden from 1939 to 1940; following this he was with Jimmy Dorsey (1941–42) and Harry James (1942-43). Alongside his spots in orchestras, he was a frequent session musician for New York recordings. In 1945 he moved to Los Angeles, where he continued as a studio guitarist, played with Arnold Ross, and led a trio. Among his credits are work with  Mildred Bailey, rhythm guitar for the Song "Grim grinning Ghosts" in Disneys Haunted Mansion, Bunny Berigan, Benny Carter, Billie Holiday, Lionel Hampton, Coleman Hawkins, Teddy Wilson and Charlie Ventura. He appeared on the Big Band standards "Sing, Sing, Sing" by Benny Goodman and "Moonlight Serenade" by Glenn Miller.

Compositions
His compositions included "Pickin' For Patsy" with Jack Teagarden, "Shufflin' at the Hollywood" with Lionel Hampton, and "More and More" with Rainey Robinson and Tommy Karen.

Bibliography

References

External links

 Allan Reuss recordings at the Discography of American Historical Recordings.

1915 births
1988 deaths
American jazz guitarists
Swing guitarists
American session musicians
20th-century American guitarists
Guitarists from New York (state)
American male guitarists
20th-century American male musicians
American male jazz musicians
Glenn Miller Orchestra members